The Saspo Holding GmbH is a German group owned by Hans Nolte and Nikolaus Gormsen.

Company overview 
The Group owns several subsidiaries, which include the Hahn Air Lines, Hahn Air Systems GmbH, Saspo Direct GmbH, and the Dreieich Sportstätten Betriebs-und Marketing GmbH. Their headquarters is in Dreieich, near Frankfurt. The Group operates offices in Amsterdam, Minneapolis, Montevideo, Paris, Casablanca, New Delhi, Johannesburg and Manila.

References

Airlines of Germany
Holding companies of Germany